Gilmer is an unincorporated community in Lake County, Illinois, United States. Gilmer is located along Gilmer Road and the Canadian National Railway north of Hawthorn Woods.

References

Unincorporated communities in Illinois
Chicago metropolitan area
Unincorporated communities in Lake County, Illinois